The 1950–51 Soviet Cup was the first edition of the Soviet Cup ice hockey tournament. 21 teams participated in the tournament, which was won by Krylya Sovetov Moscow.

Tournament

First round

1/8 finals

Quarterfinals

Semifinals

Final

External links
 Season on hockeyarchives.info
 Season on hockeyarchives.ru

Cup
Soviet Cup (ice hockey) seasons